China is one of the world's largest producers of nuclear power. The country ranks third in the world both in total nuclear power capacity installed and electricity generated, accounting for around one tenth of global nuclear power generated. Nuclear power contributed 4.9% of the total Chinese electricity production in 2019, with 348.1 TWh. As of September 2022, China operates a total of 53 nuclear reactors, with a total capacity of 55.6 gigawatt (GW).  This was short of the previous target of 58GW of installed capacity by 2020. More than 20 reactors are under construction with a total capacity of 24.2 GW.

Nuclear power has been looked into as an alternative to coal due to increasing concerns about air quality, climate change and fossil fuel shortages. 
The China General Nuclear Power Group has articulated the goal of 200 GW by 2035, produced by 150 additional reactors. 

China has two major nuclear power companies, the China National Nuclear Corporation operating mainly in north-east China, and the China General Nuclear Power Group (formerly known as China Guangdong Nuclear Power Group) operating mainly in south-east China.

China aims to maximize self-reliance on nuclear reactor technology manufacturing and design, although international cooperation and technology transfer are also encouraged. 
Advanced pressurized water reactors such as the Hualong One are the mainstream technology in the near future, and the Hualong One is also planned to be exported. China plans to build as many as thirty nuclear power reactors in countries involved in the Belt and Road Initiative by 2030. 
By mid-century fast neutron reactors are seen as the main technology, with a planned 1400 GW capacity by 2100.
China is also involved in the development of nuclear fusion reactors through its participation in the ITER project, having constructed an experimental nuclear fusion reactor known as EAST located in Hefei, as well as research and development into the thorium fuel cycle as a potential alternative means of nuclear fission.

History

1950–1958 
In the Cold War, the initial motivation of developing nuclear power for Beijing was largely due to security purposes. Between 1950 and 1958, Chinese nuclear power construction heavily relied on cooperation with the USSR. The first initiative was launched with the establishment of the China-Soviet Union Nonferrous Metals and Rare Metals Corporation and the first central atomic research facility, the Institute of Atomic Energy of the Chinese Academy of Sciences in Beijing. In February 1955, a chemical separation plant for the production of weapons-grade U-235 and plutonium was created with Soviet aid in Xinjiang and in April the Changchun Institute of Atomic Energy was established. Several months later, on April 29, 1955, the Sino-Soviet Atomic Cooperation Treaty was signed. 
The China National Nuclear Corporation (CNNC) was also established in 1955. 
In addition to the cooperation with the USSR, China has started to learn nuclear technology by sending students to the USSR. In December 1958, nuclear power development had become the top priority project in the Draft Twelve Year Plan for Development of Science and Technology.

1959–1963 
The second phase is characterized by the aim of having completely self-sufficient in nuclear power development. In June 1959, the USSR officially ended any forms of nuclear aid to China, withdrawing Soviet technicians. China suffered but continued nuclear power development by massive research and input. In order to rapidly strengthen its atomic energy industry, the Central Committee decided that China must dedicate further resources exclusively to nuclear-related activities. Consequently, the Institute of Atomic Energy created branch institutes of research organizations in every province, major city, and autonomous region. By the end of 1963, China has built more than forty chemical separation plants for the extraction of uranium and thorium. In the year between 1961 and 1962, China accomplished significant achievements in nuclear development which consolidates future applications. From 1959 to 1963, a gaseous diffusion plant utilizing a large 300 MW reactor was under construction at Lanzhou. It was estimated that the Chinese invested over $1.5 billion in the construction of this plant.

1964–Present 
After the explosive progress in the 1950s, Chinese nuclear development slowed down possibly because of Cultural Revolution so only one nuclear test took place in 1970. 
On 8 February 1970, China issued its first nuclear power plan, and the 728 Institute (now called Shanghai Nuclear Engineering Research and Design Institute) was founded.

The first independently designed and built nuclear power plant, Qinshan Nuclear Power Plant, was constructed in 1984 and successfully connected to the grid on December 15, 1991. The reactor is of type CNP-300.

Along with Chinese economic reform, China continued to demand expansion of its electricity sectors. As part of China's tenth Five-Year Plan (2001–2005), a key part of energy policy is to "guarantee energy security, optimize energy mix, improve energy efficiency, protect the ecological environment.” 
The nuclear safety plan of 2013 stated that beyond 2016 only Generation III plants would be started, and until then only a very few Generation II+ plants would be started.

In 2014, China still planned to have 58 GW of capacity by 2020. However, due to reevaluation following the Fukushima Daiichi nuclear disaster in Japan, few plants commenced construction from 2015, and this target was not met.

In 2019, China had a new target of 200 GWe of nuclear generating capacity by 2035, which is 7.7% out of predicted total electricity generating capacity of 2600 GWe.
By the end of December 2020, the total number of nuclear power units in operation on the Chinese mainland reached 49, with a total installed capacity of 51 GWe, ranking third in the world in terms of installed capacity and second in the world in terms of power generation in 2020; with 16 nuclear power units under construction, the number of units under construction and installed capacity have ranked first in the world for many years.

Safety and regulation

The National Nuclear Safety Administration (NNSA), under the China Atomic Energy Authority, is the licensing and regulatory body which also maintains international agreements regarding safety. It was set up in 1984 and reports to the State Council directly. In relation to the AP1000, NNSA works closely with the US Nuclear Regulatory Commission.

China has requested and hosted 12 Operational Safety Review Team (OSART) missions from IAEA teams to October 2011, and each plant generally has one external safety review each year, either OSART, WANO peer review, or CNEA peer review (with the Research Institute for Nuclear Power Operations).

Following the Fukushima Daiichi nuclear disaster in Japan, China announced on 16 March 2011, that all nuclear plant approvals were being frozen, and that 'full safety checks' of existing reactors would be made. Although Zhang Lijun, Vice Minister of Environmental Protection, has indicated that China's overall nuclear energy strategy would continue, some commentators have suggested that additional safety-related costs and public opinion could cause a rethink in favor of an expanded renewable energy program.

China's current methods for storing spent nuclear fuel (SNF) are only sustainable until the mid-2020s, and a policy to handle SNF needs to be developed.

In 2017, new laws strengthened the powers of the National Nuclear Safety Administration, creating new "institutional mechanisms", a clearer "division of labour" and more disclosure of information.

Reactor technologies

CNP / ACP series

The CNP Generation II nuclear reactors (and Generation III successor ACP) were a series of nuclear reactors developed by China National Nuclear Corporation (CNNC), and are predecessors of the more current Hualong One design.

The CNP series of Generation II reactors started with the CNP-300 pressurized water reactor, was the first reactor design developed domestically in China. The first unit began operation at Qinshan Nuclear Power Plant in 1991.

A larger version of the reactor, the CNP-600 was developed based on both the CNP-300 and the M310 reactor design used in Daya Bay Nuclear Power Plant. It was installed at Changjiang Nuclear Power Plant, with two units operational from 2015 and 2016, respectively. A Generation III ACP-600 successor was also developed but none were built.

A three loop, 1000-MW version of the CNP reactor, the CNP-1000, was under development since the 1990s with the help of vendors Westinghouse and Framatome (now AREVA). 4 units of the CNP-1000 were later built at Fuqing NPP. Further work on the CNP-1000 was stopped in favour of the ACP-1000.

In 2013, China announced that it had independently developed the Generation III ACP-1000, with Chinese authorities claiming full intellectual property rights over the design. As a result of the success of the Hualong One project, no ACP-1000 reactors have been built to date. CNNC had originally planned to use the ACP-1000 in Fuqing reactor 5 and 6 but switched over to the Hualong One.

CPR-1000 / ACPR-1000

The CPR-1000 was a generation Generation II reactor developed by China General Nuclear Power Group (CGN). It is the most numerous reactor type in China, with 22 units operational.
This reactor type is a Chinese development of the French 900 MWe three cooling loop design imported in the 1990s, with most of the components now built in China. 
Intellectual property rights are retained by Areva, which affects CPR-1000 overseas sales potential.

China's first CPR-1000 nuclear power plant, Ling Ao-3, was connected to the grid on 15 July 2010.
The design has been progressively built with increasing levels of Chinese components. 
Shu Guogang, GM of China Guangdong Nuclear Power Project said, "We built 55 percent of Ling Ao Phase 2, 70 percent of Hongyanhe, 80 percent of Ningde and 90 percent of Yangjiang Station."

In 2010, the China Guangdong Nuclear Power Corporation announced the ACPR1000 design, a further design evolution of the CPR-1000 to a Generation III level, which would also replace intellectual property right limited components. 
CGNPC aimed to be able to independently market the ACPR1000 for export by 2013. 
A number of ACPR1000 are under construction in China, but for export this design was superseded by the Hualong One.

Hualong One

Hualong One is jointly developed by the China National Nuclear Corporation (CNNC) and China General Nuclear Power Group (CGN), based on the three-loop ACP1000 of CNNC and ACPR1000 of CGN, which in turn are based on the French M310.

Since 2011, CNNC has been progressively merging its ACP-1000 nuclear power station design with the CGN ACPR-1000 design, while allowing some differences, under direction of the Chinese nuclear regulator. Both are three-loop designs originally based on the same French M310 design used in Daya Bay with 157 fuel assemblies, but went through different development processes (CNNC's ACP-1000 has a more domestic design with 177 fuel assemblies while CGN's ACPR-1000 is a closer copy with 157 fuel assemblies). In early 2014, it was announced that the merged design was moving from preliminary design to detailed design. Power output will be 1150 MWe, with a 60-year design life, and would use a combination of passive and active safety systems with a double containment. CNNC's 177 fuel assembly design was retained.

After the merger, both companies retain their own supply chain and their versions of the Hualong One will differ slightly (units built by CGN will retain some features from the ACPR1000) but the design is considered to be standardised. Some 85% of its components will be made domestically.

The Hualong One power output will be 1170 MWe gross, 1090 MWe net, with a 60-year design life, and would use a combination of passive and active safety systems with a double containment. It has a 177 assembly core design with an 18-month refuelling cycle. The power plant's utilisation rate is as high as 90%. CNNC has said its active and passive safety systems, double-layer containment and other technologies meet the highest international safety standards.

The Hualong One is now largely seen as the replacement for all previous Chinese nuclear reactor designs, and has been exported overseas.

Hualong Two
CNNC plans to start building a follow-on version, named Hualong Two, by 2024. It will be a more economical version using similar technology, reducing build time from 5 years to 4, and reducing costs by around a fourth from 17,000 yuan per kW to 13,000 yuan per kW.

AP1000

The Westinghouse AP1000 was planned to be the main basis of China's move to Generation III technology
In July 2018, the first of four AP1000 reactors was connected to the grid 

Following Westinghouse's bankruptcy in 2017, it was decided in 2019 to build the Hualong One rather than the AP1000 at Zhangzhou.

As of 2023, the construction of six CAP1000 are permitted by the State Council, Haiyang 3 & 4, Lianjiang 1 & 2, and Sanmen 3 & 4. Officially construction of Sanmen 3 startet in June 2022, and of Haiyang 3 in July 2022. CAP1000 are a local standardization of the AP1000 design.

CAP1400 (Guohe One)

In September 2020, China's State Power Investment Corporation launched a design based on the Westinghouse AP1000 for more widespread deployment consideration. It was given the name Guohe One.

EPR
In 2007, negotiations started with the French company Areva concerning the EPR third generation reactors. Two Areva EPR reactors were built at Taishan, and at least two more are planned. The reactors are 4590 MWt, with net power 1660 MWe.

CANDU reactors
Two AECL 728 MW CANDU-6 reactors are located at the Qinshan Nuclear Power Plant, the first went online in 2002, the second in 2003. CANDU reactors can use low grade reprocessed uranium from conventional reactors as fuel, thereby reducing China's stock of spent nuclear fuel.

VVER

Russia's Atomstroyexport was general contractor and equipment provider for the Tianwan AES-91 power plants using the V-428 version of the well-proven VVER-1000 reactor of 1060 MWe capacity. Russia's Energoatom is responsible for maintenance from 2009. Two further Tianwan units will use the same version of the VVER-1000 reactor.

On 7 March 2019, China National Nuclear Corporation (CNNC) and Atomstroyexport signed the detailed contract for the construction of four VVER-1200s, two each at the Tianwan Nuclear Power Plant and the Xudabao Nuclear Power Plant. Construction will start in May 2021, and commercial operation of all the units is expected between 2026 and 2028.

Generation IV reactors

China is developing several generation IV reactor designs. 
The HTR-PM, a HTGR, is under construction. The HTR-PM is a descendant of the AVR reactor, and it is partly based on the earlier Chinese HTR-10 reactor.
A sodium-cooled fast reactor, the CFR-600, is also under construction.

ACP100 small modular reactor
In July 2019, China National Nuclear Corporation announced it would start building a demonstration ACP100 small modular reactor (SMR) on the north-west side of the existing Changjiang Nuclear Power Plant by the end of the year. Design of the ACP100 started in 2010 and it was the first SMR project to pass an independent safety assessment by International Atomic Energy Agency in 2016. It is also referred to as Linglong One and is a fully integrated reactor module with an internal coolant system, with a 2-year refuelling interval, producing 385 MWt and about 125 MWe, and incorporates passive safety features, and can be installed underground.

Nuclear power plants 

Most nuclear power plants in China are located on the coast and generally use seawater for cooling a direct once-through cycle. The New York Times has reported that China is placing many of its nuclear plants near large cities, and there is a concern that tens of millions of people could be exposed to radiation in the event of an accident.
China's neighboring Daya Bay and Lingao nuclear plants have around 28 million people within a 75-kilometre radius that covers Hong Kong.

Future projects 
Following the Fukushima accident and consequent pause in approvals for new plants, the target adopted by the State Council in October 2012 became 60 GWe by 2020, with 30 GWe under construction. In 2015, the target for nuclear capacity on line in 2030 was 150 GWe, providing almost 10% of electricity, and 240 GWe in 2050 providing 15%.

However, from 2016 to 2018, there was a further hiatus in the new build programme, with no new approvals for at least two years, causing the programme to slow sharply. Delays in the Chinese builds of AP1000 and EPR reactors, together with the bankruptcy in the U.S. of Westinghouse, the designer of the AP1000, have created uncertainties about the future direction. Also, some regions of China now have excess generation capacity, and it has become less certain to what extent electricity prices can economically sustain nuclear new build while the Chinese government is gradually liberalising the generation sector.

In 2018, a Nuclear Engineering International journal analysis suggests a below-plan capacity of 90 GWe is plausible for 2030.
, China had 45GW of operational nuclear power, with 11GW under construction (see Table below)

Bloomberg News reported that the 2020 National People's Congress supported future building of 6 to 8 reactors a year, which Bloomberg considered likely to be dominated by the domestic Hualong One design.  In 2019, China had a new target of 200 GWe of nuclear generating capacity by 2035, which is 7.7% out of predicted total electricity generating capacity of 2600 GWe.

The role of the IPPs 
The first major successful profitable commercial project was the Daya Bay Nuclear Plant, which is 25% owned by CLP Group of Hong Kong and exports 70% of its electricity to Hong Kong. Such imports supply 20% of Hong Kong's electricity.

In order to access the capital needed to meet the 2020 target of 80GW, China has begun to grant equity in nuclear projects to China's Big Five power corporations:
 Huaneng Group,
 Huadian Group – Fujian Fuqing nuclear power project II and III
 Datang Group,
 China Power Investment Group – Jiangxi Pengze Nuclear
 Guodian Group
Like the two nuclear companies China National Nuclear Corporation and China Guangdong Nuclear Power Group (CGNPG) the Big Five are State-owned "Central Enterprises" (中央企业) administered by SASAC. However, unlike the two nuclear companies, they have listed subsidiaries in Hong Kong and a broad portfolio of thermal, hydro and wind.

Summary of nuclear power plants

Where multiple reactors are operational/under construction/planned at a given site, the capacity given is to be understood for all reactors at this site applicable to the given column, not a per reactor figure.

Fuel cycle 

China is evaluating the construction of a high level waste (HLW) repository in the Gobi Desert, probably constructed near Beishan starting around 2041.

Starting in about the 2010s, China has been making serious efforts towards nuclear reprocessing. While those plants are ostensibly civilian in nature, there is concern as to the Dual Use applicability of the technology with several Western media outlets writing articles with the verbatim same headline "China nuclear reprocessing to create stockpiles of weapons-level materials: Experts" China has also pioneered the use of a reprocessed uranium / depleted uranium mixture "natural uranium equivalent" in its Pressurized Heavy Water Reactors at Qinshan Nuclear Power Plant. Unlike the similar "DUPIC" process ("direct use of spent PWR fuel in CANDU") pioneered in South Korea, this process separately recovers the reactor grade plutonium for other uses, fueling the heavy water reactor with the uranium content of the spent fuel alone.

Companies 

 China National Nuclear Corporation
 China General Nuclear Power Group
 State Nuclear Power Technology Corporation
 China Nuclear International Uranium Corporation

Research

 In January 2011, the Chinese Academy of Sciences began the TMSR research and development project to create reactors which, among other advances, will be air-cooled. A small prototype reactor of this type, the TMSR-LF1, is planned. The LF1 will be sited in Gansu province, in an industrial park in Minqin County.

In February 2019, China's State Power Investment Corporation (SPIC) signed a cooperation agreement with the Baishan municipal government in Jilin province for the Baishan Nuclear Energy Heating Demonstration Project, which would use a China National Nuclear Corporation DHR-400 (District Heating Reactor 400 MWt).

Public opposition 
China is experiencing civil protest over its ambitious plans to build more nuclear power plants following the Fukushima nuclear disaster. There has been "inter-provincial squabble" over a nuclear power plant being built near the southern bank of the Yangtze River. The plant in the centre of the controversy is located in Pengze county in Jiangxi and across the river the government of Wangjiang county in Anhui wants the project shelved.

More than 1,000 people protested in Jiangmen City Hall in July 2013 to demand authorities abandon a planned uranium-processing facility that was designed as a major supplier to nuclear power stations. The Heshan Nuclear Power Industry Park was to be equipped with facilities for uranium conversion and enrichment as well as the manufacturing of fuel pellets, rods and finished assemblies. Protesters feared the plant would adversely affect their health, and the health of future generations. As the weekend protest continued, Chinese officials announced the state-run project's cancellation.

By 2014, concerns about public opposition caused Chinese regulators to develop public and media support programmes, and developers to begin outreach programmes including site tours and visitor centres.

In 2020, Bloomberg News reported that public opposition had stopped nuclear power construction on inland river sites, and caused the cancellation of a nuclear fuel plant in Guangdong in 2013.

See also 

 Electricity sector in China
 Energy policy of China
 List of commercial nuclear reactors#China
 Nuclear power by country
 Nuclear energy policy
 Strategic uranium reserves

References

External links 
 Nuclear power in China – World Nuclear Association
 Maps of Nuclear Power Reactors: China
 Brief Overview of Chinese NPP Development, Shanghai Nuclear Engineering Research and Design Institute, 23 June 2011
 
 

Science and technology in the People's Republic of China